/e/ (also known as /e/ OS and /e/OS, formerly Eelo) is a fork of LineageOS, an Android-based mobile operating system, and associated online services. /e/ is presented as privacy software that does not contain proprietary Google apps or services, and challenges the public to "find any parts of the system or default applications that are still leaking data to Google."

Software 
/e/ is a fork of LineageOS, which is a fork of the CyanogenMod and Android operating systems. /e/ uses MicroG, "an open source project that hijacks Google API calls." according to Ron Amadeo of ars Technica, as an alternative for Google Play Services, and Mozilla Location Service for geolocation.

Some /e/ applications and sources are proprietary. As of June 2022, /e/ includes a proprietary maps app. A privacy app was proprietary when first developed, then open source after release. Sources for some devices are not publicly available, according to foundation staff.

History 
In 2017, Mandrake Linux creator Gaël Duval proposed the concept of an operating system without privacy-invasive software as a "non-profit project 'in the public interest'". Duval wrote, "Apple, Google, Facebook etc., business models are harmful for our economical and social environments". The operating system was initially called Eelo; the name was inspired by moray eels, which Duval saw as "fish that can hide in the sea". Duval launched a Kickstarter crowdfunding campaign with an initial goal of €25,000, and received at least €71,000 from contributors.

Beta versions of /e/ were released for 20 to 30 smartphone models in September 2018. As of November 2019 /e/ supported 89 smartphone models. As of April 2020, /e/ was teaming with Fairphone to sell phones.

Corporations and organizations 
ECORP SAS, a privately held corporation founded in 2018 with Gael Duval President and Alexis Noetinger General Director, operates the online store selling phones with /e/ operating system pre-installed, and the included online services.

ESolutions SAS, a privately held corporation, was formed in January 2020 with Ecorp SAS listed as President and Alexis Noetinger as General Director. ESolutions operates the online store for sales of phones and cloud storage subscriptions.

As of May 2022, it was announced a "Murena One" phone would be sold by Murena company with /e/ included. The Murena company was established as a different entity for selling these phones, and ESolutions SAS was re-named Murena Retail. As of August 2022, the Murena One has been on backorder since announced.

Reception 
The Free Software Foundation declined to endorse /e/ because it "contains nonfree libraries". Ross Rubin of Fast Company described /e/'s strategy as a "Google-like approach" of maximizing user adoption, in contrast to hardware manufacturer and software developer Purism's "Apple-like approach" of vertical integration. Jack Wallen of TechRepublic believed that /e/ will "prove Android can exist without Google", but predicted that the operating system would not appeal to ordinary smartphone users. Sascha Segan of PC Magazine was "encouraged by /e/, and by its determination to create an easy-to-use (and, hopefully, easy to install) alternative," but was "queasy about the sources of third-party apps on /e/." He also defended /e/ against InfoSec Handbook's criticisms, which /e/ "took to heart and has been working on it in public bug threads anyone can read online." Steven Vaughan-Nichols reviewed a refurbished Samsung phone with pre-installed /e/ paralleling Android 8.1, and found it to be "quite stable," but said "applications can be a pain" and "installing /e/ is a monster of a job."

In November 2020, Tim Anderson of The Register said installation of /e/ is "not for the fainthearted" but the operating system "feels lightweight and responsive" because of "fewer background services than on a typical Android device."

In February 2021 Ferdinand Thommes of Linux News .de published a submitted review of Fairphone 3 with pre-installed /e/. They called it "very expensive" and said on initial startup, an operating system update was needed, which took about 15 minutes. After a few minutes the Bliss Launcher was "annoying" so they replaced it with a different launcher from F-Droid, which took "about 3 hours." Fingerprint sensing did not work reliably initially or after a sensor replacement. /e/ support was friendly, competent and quick responding. "Despite all the negative points" they "can recommend both device and operating system."

In a review in March 2021, Ron Amadeo of ars Technica said, "Actually getting regular Android apps to run on a forked version of Android is a challenge", and "there's a good chance that functionality won't work on /e/ OS." He also described "/e/’s communication problems".

In May 2022, according to Liam Proven writing for The Register, /e/ Foundation announced sales of "privacy-centric" phones branded as Murena phones including Murena One, a budget hardware device running Android 10, and priced "noticeably more expensive than the rock-bottom budget end of the market". Proven also said /e/ OS feels "clunky in places", functionality is restricted compared with full Google Android, but it works, is fast and stable. David Pierce of The Verge said App Lounge required accepting Terms of Service, and you download Play apps from Google in a "different-looking store". The connection to Google made "a lot of Murena's early testers mad" according to Pierce. Pierce concluded Murena and /e/OS show "how ingrained Google is in our digital lives" and how much control Google has. Michael Allison of Digital Trends said "Murena will all but certainly fail" and "A de-Googled smartphone can never hit mass appeal".

Reception by XDA developers is that the system is a walled garden. But nothing stopped users from installing Aurora Store to access Play Store apps.

Controversies

Data leakage incident 
In May 2022, during several days of cloud infrastructure maintenance, e foundation spokesman arnauvp stated an error applying a patch caused data leakage between different user accounts, including screenshots, photos, and note files. On May 29, 2022, owner Gael Duval stated a maximum of 3307 users (about 5% of ecloud users) were involved, and said "We will share more information about our findings within 72 hours." Over a month later on July 4, 2022, e foundation announced a revised number of impacted users of 379 total, with no details of the investigation or error provided.

Trademark 
Eelo was subsequently renamed to /e/ in July 2018 due to a conflict with the "eelloo" trademark, which was owned by a human resources company. In a March 2020 interview, Duval stated the /e/ name would be abandoned "for something else quite soon".

See also 

 Comparison of mobile operating systems
Criticism of Google
DeGoogle
 List of custom Android distributions

References

External links 
 

Android forks
Custom Android firmware
Embedded Linux distributions
Free mobile software
Linux distributions
Linux distributions without systemd
Mobile operating systems